Richard Henry Tizard (25 June 1917 – 5 September 2005) was a distinguished engineer and founding Fellow of Churchill College, Cambridge.

The 1960s were a period of turbulence in academic governance, and Cambridge students did not revolt less than their peers at LSE and elsewhere.
Tizard came from a family of high achievers with a productive stubborn streak. He used his political skills to marshal his grammar, state and public school intake behind a programme of historic renewal and reform in the University. In 1969, he led his colleagues to accept students into membership of the College Council and to admit women, the first Cambridge men's college to do so.

In 1970 Churchill's student union, the Junior Common Room (JCR), inspired by the worldwide student democracy movement, led the NUS in taking the Cambridge Town Clerk to the High Court to overturn a 19th-century precedent that denied students the right to vote in their university towns. This new interpretation of electoral law was made possible by the Labour Government's Sixth Reform Act.

As Senior Tutor, Tizard pioneered outreach, admitting 600 men from 300 schools. After his retirement, he discussed with non-resident members of the JCR the possibility of their extending this outreach activity to 30 primary schools.

See also
Sir Henry Tizard
Arthur Ransome
Thomas Henry Tizard

External links
 The Times, 15 December 2005, Distinguished engineer and influential founding Fellow of Churchill College, Cambridge
 The Independent, 10 October 2005, 
 The Stanford Tizard Programme,  

1917 births
2005 deaths
People educated at Rugby School
Alumni of Oriel College, Oxford
20th-century British engineers
Fellows of Churchill College, Cambridge